Blue Norther (1961–1972) was an American Thoroughbred racehorse.

The Blue Norther Stakes is named for the filly.

Racing career
Along with Tosmah and Miss Cavandish, was a top filly in United States racing in 1964. Ridden by jockey Bill Shoemaker and trained by Wally Dunn, she won all five of her 1964 starts including three major races for fillies of her age group.

Retirement
Retired to broodmare duty after being diagnosed with a chipped sesamoid bone, Blue Norther was bred twice to Bold Ruler and once to Buckpasser but none of the foals went on to successful racing.

Blue Norther died of a twisted intestine at Claiborne Farm on June 9, 1972.

Legacy
The Blue Norther Stakes race, run at Santa Anita each December is named for the filly.

References 

 Blue Norther's pedigree and partial racing stats

1961 racehorse births
1972 racehorse deaths
Racehorses bred in Kentucky
Racehorses trained in the United States
Kentucky Oaks winners
Thoroughbred family 3-n